"Explode" is a song written by Canadian singer Nelly Furtado and Gerald Eaton for Furtado's second studio album, Folklore (2003). It is produced by Eaton and was released in September 2004 as the fourth single from the album. The song charted in the top 40 in Netherlands, Switzerland and Germany. Furtado said the song "came from a poem I wrote called Teenage Waste. When you're a teenager, you want to try everything; you're like a little firecracker. Your wiser self is there, somewhere deep down, depending on how young or old your soul is. But it doesn’t always show itself. "Explode" is visceral; it's guttural. That's why part of the song uses terms from Capoeira, the Brazilian martial arts form. It touches on teenage experimentation and bliss and fun, but also on some violence and aggression."

Music video
The video for "Explode" was shot in the Central Technical School in Toronto, Ontario and directed by Bradley Cayford and Nelly Furtado. It starts with the real Furtado walking into a room with her guitar singing in front of a microphone. It then shows the cartoon Furtado walking at school with her guitar case. At the chorus it has intercuts of the real Furtado and the cartoon version. The cartoon version is running to her tree house in the forest for the second verse while the real Furtado is singing. The cartoon then starts to write a song as the viewer gets an insight to the character's imagination and a legend of three monsters living in the forest.   The cartoon Furtado runs into the forest where she sees the monsters and begins to dance with them.  The cartoon Furtado is then seen back in the tree house, writing the song.  The conclusion of the video shows the real Furtado singing behind the microphone while playing guitar then leaving the same room. There is an alternate version of the video that shows Nelly singing the song in black and white beside a river.

Track listing
CD single

European CD single

European maxi single

Charts

Release history

References

2004 singles
Nelly Furtado songs
Songs written by Gerald Eaton
Songs written by Nelly Furtado
2003 songs
DreamWorks Records singles
Interscope Records singles